Lucia A. Reisch is a German behavioural economist and social scientist by training and the El-Erian Professor of Behavioural Economics and Policy at the University of Cambridge since September 2021. Since April 2022 the Professorship is located at the Cambridge Judge Business School. Before joining Cambridge, she was a professor at Copenhagen Business School (CBS). She also holds an honorary Leibniz Professorship from Leibniz Institute for Prevention Research in Bremen as well as a Guest Professorship from Zeppelin University, Friedrichshafen.

Early life and education 
After having studied economics and social science at the University of Hohenheim (with semesters at UCLA), Reisch graduated in 1988. In 1994 she received her doctorate in economics also from the University of Hohenheim.

Career 
Reisch has served as a lecturer at the University of Hohenheim, Technical University of Munich and gave guest lectures at the University of St Gallen (CH) and University of Aarhus / Aarhus School of Business. From September 2021 Reisch held the El-Erian Professor of Behavioural Economics and Policy at the University of Cambridge. In this role she is responsible for building and leading the new El-Erian Institute, situated within the Cambridge Judge Business School as of April 2022. Previously she held a full professorship at the Copenhagen Business School,  Department of Management, Society and Communication, CBS Sustainability. At CBS she founded the  Consumer and Behavioral Insights Group (CBIG).

Her research focus is consumer science, sustainable consumption, behavioural economics, and consumer policy. She is the Editor in Chief of the Journal of Consumer Policy. Based on her scientific reputation she was elected to become one of the 400 lifelong members of Germany's Academy of Science and Engineering (Acatech). In addition to her professorship at the University of Cambridge she also holds a permanent Guest Professorship at the Zeppelin University of Friedrichshafen as well as a Leibniz Professorship at the Leibniz Institute for Prevention Research and Epidemiology - BIPS (Germany).

Other activities 
In 2011, Reisch was appointed by German Chancellor Angela Merkel to join the Ethics Commission for Safe Energy Supply that assessed, after the Fukushima Daiichi nuclear disaster, the potentials of a nuclear phase-out (by 2022) and therewith help prepare Germany's energy transition. She has been member and Chairwoman of the Scientific Advisory Board for Consumer, Food, and Nutrition Policies to the German Federal Ministry of Consumer Protection, Food and Agriculture (2002‐2011). She was a long-standing member of the German Council for Sustainable Development (2010-2019) and the German Bioeconomy Council, both consulting the German government. Between 2014 and 2018, she chaired the Scientific Advisory Board for Consumer Affairs (Sachverständigenrat für Verbraucherfragen) at the German Federal Ministry of Justice and Consumer Protection. Since 2016 she is member and spokesperson of the Sustainability Board of Dr. Ing. h.c. Porsche AG, which advises the Executive Board on orienting the sports car company’s strategy towards sustainability.

Today, Reisch is a member of the boards of Stiftung Warentest in Berlin  and a number of other foundations.

Research areas 

 Consumer research
 Consumer policy
 Behavioural economics
 Sustainable consumption
 Public health and consumers

Selected articles 
 Kaiser, Micha; Bernauer, Manuela; Sunstein, Cass R.; Reisch, Lucia A. (2020). "The power of green defaults: The impact of regional variation of opt-out tariffs on green energy demand in Germany". Ecological Economics. 174: 106685. .
 Sunstein, Cass R.; Reisch, Lucia A.; Kaiser, Micha (2019). "Trusting nudges? Lessons from an international survey". Journal of European Public Policy. 26 (10): 1417-1443. .
 Sunstein, Cass R.; Reisch, Lucia A. (2019). Trusting nudges: Toward a bill of rights for nudging (1 ed.). London: Routledge. .
 Reisch, Lucia A.; Zhao, Min (2017). "Behavioural economics, consumer behaviour, and consumer policy: State of the art". Behavioural Public Policy. 1 (2): 190-206. .
 Reisch, Lucia A.; Sunstein, Cass R. (2016). "Do Europeans like nudges?". Judgment and Decision Making. 11 (4): 310-325.
 Sunstein, Cass R.;  Reisch, Lucia A. (Eds.) (2016). The economics of nudge (1 ed.). Routledge Major Works Collection. Critical Concepts in Economics. London: Routledge. .
 Sunstein, Cass R.; Reisch, Lucia A. (2014). "Automatically green: Behavioral economics and environmental protection". Harvard Environmental Law Review. 38: 127–158.

References

Official website 
 Prof. Dr. Lucia A. Reisch's official website

Living people
German women academics
Copenhagen Business School
Sustainability advocates
Behavioral economists
German economists
German women economists
German social scientists
Academic staff of Copenhagen Business School
Fellows of Queens' College, Cambridge
1964 births